Phongsit Veangviseth (born 22 January 1972) also known as Wanwiset Kaennorasing (วันวิเศษ แก่นนรสิงห์) is a Thai boxer and Muay Thai kickboxer. In amateur boxing he competed at the 1996 Summer Olympics and the 2000 Summer Olympics in Lightweight division.

Career
Veangviseth born in Mueang Khon Kaen District, Khon Kaen Province in boxer family, his family runs a Muay Thai gym. His father was a former Muay Thai kickboxer under the name "Kingkanha Sakpramuan" (กิ่งกัญหา ศักดิ์ประมวล). Veangviseth, fighting as Wanwiset was a notable fighter during the "golden era" of Muay Thai where he received purses of hundreds of thousands of baht per bout. He made his debut in Bangkok in 1991 with a regular fight at Rajadamnern Stadium. He faced some of the top-line Muay Thai kickboxers, for example Chamuekpet Hapalang, Methee Jaydeepitak, Noppadej Sor.Rewadee, Tahaneak Praeaumpol, Chaidej Kiatchansing, Chatchai Paiseetong, Yodkhunpon Sittraiphum, Veeraphol Sahaprom, etc. He also served as a trainer for the famous camp Jocky gym during his fighting career.

For amateur boxing he competed in his first major tournament at the 1996 Summer Olympics in Atlanta by joining the same team as Somluck Kamsing, a first Thai Summer Olympics gold medalist. He also competed again at the next Summer Olympics, in Sydney in 2000.

He was the head trainer of the 13Reanresort camp for many years before returning to his native province.

In his personal life, it can be considered that he is good friend with Somrak Kamsing, both of them are Khon Kaen people and their wives are sisters.

Titles and honours

Muay Thai
 1994 Rajadamnern Stadium Featherweight Champion 
 1994 Sports Authority of Thailand Fighter of the Year

Boxing
Amateur
 1995 Thailand King's Cup -57kg 
1995 Southeast Asian Games -60kg 
 1997 Thailand King's Cup -60kg 
1998 Asian Games -60kg 

Professional
PABA Super Featherweight Champion (2002–2005)

References

External links
 

1972 births
Living people
Phongsit Veangviseth
Phongsit Veangviseth
Boxers at the 1996 Summer Olympics
Boxers at the 2000 Summer Olympics
Place of birth missing (living people)
Asian Games medalists in boxing
Boxers at the 1998 Asian Games
Phongsit Veangviseth
Medalists at the 1998 Asian Games
Lightweight boxers
Competitors at the 1995 Southeast Asian Games
Phongsit Veangviseth
Southeast Asian Games medalists in boxing
Phongsit Veangviseth